Tricorynus is a genus of deathwatch and spider beetles in the family Ptinidae. There are at least 90 described species in Tricorynus.

See also
 List of Tricorynus species

References

Further reading

External links

 

Ptinidae